This is a comprehensive list of victories of the  cycling team. The races are categorized according to the UCI Continental Circuits rules. The team participates in UCI Continental Circuits races and when selected as a wildcard to UCI World Tour events.

Sources:

1994 Vlaanderen 2002

1995 Vlaanderen 2002 
Stage 4 Tour of the Netherlands, Tom Steels
Nationale Sluitingsprijs, Tom Steels
Grote 1-MeiPrijs, Tom Steels
GP van Steenbergen, Tom Steels

1996 Vlaanderen 2002 
Schaal Sels, Glenn D'Hollander
Grand Prix d'Isbergues, Mario Aerts
Stage 9 Tour of Austria, Luc Roosen
Stage 10 Tour of Austria, Glenn D'Hollander

1997 Vlaanderen 2002 

Overall Circuit Franco-Belge, Mario Aerts
Stage 1, Geert Van Bondt
Stage 3, Kris Gerits
Overall Circuito Montañés, Kurt Van De Wouwer
Stage 1, Erwin Thijs

1998 Vlaanderen 2002 

Eurode Omloop, Glenn D'Hollander
Stage 3 Circuit Franco-Belge, Kris Gerits
Zellik–Galmaarden, Kris Gerits
Flèche Ardennaise, Kris Gerits
Stage 4 Tour of the Netherlands, Peter Wuyts
Stage 1 Tour de l'Avenir, Leif Hoste
Stage 2 Tour de l'Avenir, Peter Wuyts

1999 Vlaanderen 2002 

Stage 5 Circuit des Mines, Wilfried Cretskens
Stage 6b Circuit des Mines, Stive Vermaut
Stage 1 Circuito Montañés, Glenn D'Hollander
Stage 4b Circuito Montañés, Team time trial
Stage 3a Bayern Rundfahrt, Kris Gerits
Eurode Omloop, Kris Gerits
Flèche Namuroise-Bioul, Wilfried Cretskens

2000 Vlaanderen 2002 
Stages 2 & 3 Ster der Beloften, Erwin Thijs
Ronde van Limburg, Erwin Thijs
Stage 2 Dekra Open Stuttgart, Björn Leukemans
Stage 3 Dekra Open Stuttgart, Erwin Thijs

2001 Vlaanderen–T-Interim 
Le Samyn, Kris Gerits
Stage 3 Tour de la Somme, Nico Sijmens

2002 Vlaanderen–T-Interim 
Stage 2 Circuito Montañés, Geoffrey Demeyere

2003 Vlaanderen–T-Interim 

Hel van het Mergelland, Wim Van Huffel
Stage 6b Circuit des Mines, Wouter Van Mechelen
Stages 4 & 6 Tour of Austria, Nico Sijmens
Overall Circuito Montañés, Steven Kleynen
Stage 3, Nico Sijmens
Stage 2 Tour of China, Nico Sijmens

2004 Vlaanderen–T-Interim 

Grand Prix de la Ville de Lillers, Benny Deschrooder
Stages 1 & 3 Vuelta a La Rioja, Jan Kuyckx
Stage 9 Circuit des Mines, Wouter Van Mechelen
Stage 6 Tour of Austria, Jan Kuyckx
Stage 5a Circuito Montañés, Wesley Van der Linden
Brussel–Ingooigem, Steven Caethoven
Stage 4 Regio-Tour, Steven Caethoven
Schaal Sels, Geoffrey Demeyere
Stage 3 Tour de l'Avenir, Steven Caethoven
Stage 3 Tour de la Somme, Wouter Van Mechelen

2005 Chocolade Jacques–T-Interim 

Grand Prix Rudy Dhaenens, Koen Barbé
Dwars door Vlaanderen, Niko Eeckhout
Stage 2 Three Days of De Panne, Niko Eeckhout
Stage 4a Rheinland-Pfalz Rundfahrt, Pieter Mertens
Stage 1 Sachsen Tour, Steven Caethoven
Grand Prix d'Isbergues, Niko Eeckhout
Omloop van het Houtland, Kevin van Impe
Omloop van de Vlaamse Scheldeboorden, Niko Eeckhout
Stage 1 Circuit Franco-Belge, Niko Eeckhout

2006 Chocolade Jacques–Topsport Vlaanderen 

Overall Étoile de Bessèges, Frederik Willems
Stage 1, Frederik Willems
Beverbeek Classic, Evert Verbist
De Vlaamse Pijl, Evert Verbist
Overall Driedaagse van West-Vlaanderen, Niko Eeckhout
Stage 3, Niko Eeckhout
Omloop van het Waasland, Niko Eeckhout
Dwars door Vlaanderen, Frederik Veuchelen
Stage 5 Rheinland-Pfalz Rundfahrt, Steven Caethoven
Stage 3 Ster Elektrotoer, Frederik Willems
 Road Race Championships, Niko Eeckhout
Stage 4 Tour of Austria, Pieter Ghyllebert
Stage 4 Tour of Britain, Frederik Willems
Memorial Rik Van Steenbergen, Niko Eeckhout
Kampioenschap van Vlaanderen, Niko Eeckhout
Stage 3 Circuit Franco-Belge, Niko Eeckhout

2007 Chocolade Jacques–Topsport Vlaanderen

Stage 2 Tour Down Under, Steven Caethoven
Stage 4 Tour Down Under, Pieter Ghyllebert
De Vlaamse Pijl, Jelle Vanendert
Omloop van het Waasland, Niko Eeckhout
Internatie Reningelst, Iljo Keisse
Schaal Sels, Kenny Dehaes

2008 Topsport Vlaanderen
Beverbeek Classic, Johan Coenen
Omloop van het Waasland, Niko Eeckhout
Stage 3 Four Days of Dunkirk, Kenny Dehaes
Stage 1 Tour of Belgium, Kenny Dehaes

2009 Topsport Vlaanderen–Mercator 
Omloop van het Waasland, Johan Coenen
Internationale Wielertrofee Jong Maar Moedig, Thomas De Gendt
Stage 4 Tour de Wallonie, Thomas De Gendt
Stage 3 Vuelta a Burgos, Nikolas Maes

2010 Topsport Vlaanderen–Mercator 

Stage 2 Tour of Qatar, Geert Steurs
Stage 3 Driedaagse van West-Vlaanderen, Kris Boeckmans
Grand Prix of Aargau Canton, Kristof Vandewalle
Stage 5 Ster Elektrotoer, Kris Boeckmans
Stage 2 Danmark Rundt, Michael Van Staeyen
Memorial Rik Van Steenbergen, Michael Van Staeyen

2011 Topsport Vlaanderen–Mercator 
Sparkassen Giro Bochum, Pieter Vanspeybrouck

2012 Topsport Vlaanderen–Mercator 
Beverbeek Classic, Tom Van Asbroeck
Omloop van het Waasland, Preben Van Hecke
Internationale Wielertrofee Jong Maar Moedig, Tim Declercq
Grote Prijs Stad Geel, Tom Van Asbroeck

2013 Topsport Vlaanderen–Baloise 

Stage 1 Étoile de Bessèges, Michael Van Staeyen
Omloop van het Waasland, Pieter Jacobs
Internationale Wielertrofee Jong Maar Moedig, Tim Declercq
Grote Prijs Stad Geel, Yves Lampaert
Antwerpse Havenpijl, Preben Van Hecke
Stage 1 World Ports Classic, Jelle Wallays
Schaal Sels, Pieter Jacobs
Grand Prix de la Somme, Preben Van Hecke

2014 Topsport Vlaanderen–Baloise 

Paris–Tours, Jelle Wallays
Grand Prix d'Ouverture La Marseillaise, Kenneth Vanbilsen
Stage 1 Étoile de Bessèges, Sander Helven
Cholet-Pays de Loire, Tom Van Asbroeck
Stage 2 Boucles de la Mayenne, Eliot Lietaer
Stage 4 Tour de Wallonie, Tom Van Asbroeck
Internationale Wielertrofee Jong Maar Moedig, Gijs Van Hoecke
Grote Prijs Stad Zottegem, Edward Theuns
Arnhem–Veenendaal Classic, Yves Lampaert
De Kustpijl, Michael Van Staeyen
Omloop van het Houtland, Jelle Wallays

2015 Topsport Vlaanderen–Baloise 

Dwars door Vlaanderen, Jelle Wallays
Ronde van Drenthe, Edward Theuns
Stage 5 Four Days of Dunkirk, Edward Theuns
Grand Prix Criquielion, Jelle Wallays
 Road Race Championships, Preben Van Hecke
Dwars door de Vlaamse Ardennen, Stijn Steels
Polynormande, Oliver Naesen
Gooikse Pijl, Oliver Naesen
Duo Normand, Victor Campenaerts & Jelle Wallays
Stage 3 Tour de l'Eurométropole, Edward Theuns

2016 Topsport Vlaanderen–Baloise 
Grand Prix de la Ville de Lillers, Stijn Steels

2017 Sport Vlaanderen–Baloise 
Stage 1 Tour des Fjords, Dries Van Gestel
De Kustpijl, Christophe Noppe
Grote Prijs Marcel Kint, Jonas Rickaert

2018 Sport Vlaanderen–Baloise 
Stage 8 Rás Tailteann, Robbe Ghys

2019 Sport Vlaanderen–Baloise 
Tour de l'Eurométropole, Piet Allegaert

2020 Sport Vlaanderen–Baloise 
Heistse Pijl, Sasha Weemaes

2021 Sport Vlaanderen–Baloise 
Stage 1 Tour of Belgium, Robbe Ghys
Grand Prix du Morbihan, Arne Marit
Ronde van Drenthe, Rune Herregodts

2022 Sport Vlaanderen–Baloise 
Stage 1 Vuelta a Andalucía, Rune Herregodts
Stage 1 Sazka Tour, Rune Herregodts

Supplementary statistics

1994 to 2014

2015 to present

Notes

References

External links

Lists of wins by cycling team